John Leech was an English medieval jurist and university chancellor.

Leech was a professor of Canon Law at Oxford University. Between 1338 and 1339, he was Chancellor of the university.

References

14th-century English lawyers
Canon law jurists
Chancellors of the University of Oxford
14th-century Roman Catholics
Year of birth unknown
Year of death unknown
English male writers